Astro Vaanavil is a Malaysian pay television channel that broadcasts programming in Tamil, targeting the Indian community in Malaysia. It was launched on 1 June 1996. It was created by Astro. Starting 1 June 2020, Astro Vaanavil has been officially upgraded to SD/HD and is known as Astro Vaanavil HD.

It is the dominant local channel targeted at the Indian community in Malaysia.

Programmes
All programmes on Astro Vaanavil were dubbed in Malaysian Tamil with Malay subtitles, and contain sexual content, mild violence and adult language, which may be unsuitable for children to watch Playboy TV’s Tamil-dubbed programmes, especially on Astro’s electronic programme guide (EPG), but with all channel listings of all genres.

Malaysian

Oggy And The Cockroaches
Ippadikku Ila (1- 19 February 2021)
Appalasamy Apartments (February 2021)
Supramani (March 2021)
Swaralayam 
Tamiletchumy 2 (12 August onwards)

Reality Shows
Aaatam 100 Vagai
Vaanavil Superstar
Paadal Thiran Potti

Other shows
Vizhuthugal-Samugathin Kural is a morning talk show that discovers on topics about the current issues that is happening around Malaysia.The show's 14th season was airing on Astro Vaanavil Channel 201 (SD) before started broadcasting again on Astro Vaanavil Channel 201 (SD/HD) on 1 June. Several months later, the show is rebranded and changed to primetime slot at 9.00pm.

360° is about the Indian community living in Malaysia and the activities happening in town.

References

Astro Malaysia Holdings television channels
Television channels and stations established in 1996
Tamil-language television channels
Vaanavil